Annichen Kringstad (born 15 July 1960 in Oslo, Norway) is a Swedish orienteer. Kringstad was the first household name orienteer in Sweden, and she was a major reason for the popularisation of the sport. Kringstad won the world championships individually as well as in the relay format in 1981, 1983 and 1985, before retiring at the age of 25. She represented Säffle OK, OK Ravinen and Stora Tuna IK orienteering clubs.

She won the Svenska Dagbladet Gold Medal and Jerring Award in 1981.

References

External links
 

1960 births
Living people
Swedish orienteers
Female orienteers
Foot orienteers
World Orienteering Championships medalists